Jay Rubenstein (born 1967) is an American historian of the Middle Ages.

Life
Rubenstein grew up in Cushing, Oklahoma and attended Carleton College in Northfield, Minnesota where he graduated with a B.A. in 1989. From 1989-1991 he studied at the University of Oxford as a Rhodes Scholar. In recognition of this achievement, his hometown of Cushing named a street after him. In 1991 he completed an M.Phil. from Oxford, writing a thesis on the veneration of saints' relics in England after the Norman Conquest. 
In 1997, he received a Ph.D. in history from the University of California, Berkeley, working under the supervision of Professor Gerard Caspary.
After leaving Berkeley he taught one year at Dickinson College, one year at Syracuse University, and seven years at University of New Mexico.

He is currently a history professor at USC Dana and David Dornsife College of Letters, Arts and Sciences and Director of the USC Center for the Premodern World. 

His published scholarship has focused on medieval intellectual history, monastic life, and the early crusade movement.

Awards
 2012 Ralph Waldo Emerson Award from Phi Beta Kappa for significant contributions to interpretations of the intellectual and cultural condition of humanity. 
 2007 MacArthur Fellows Program
 2007 National Endowment for the Humanities Fellowship
 2006 ACLS Burkhardt Fellowship
 2004 William Koren, Jr. Prize from the Society for French Historical Studies for the outstanding journal article published on any era of French history by a North American scholar
 2002 ACLS Fellowship

Works

 
 
 
 "Cannibals and Crusaders," French Historical Studies 31 (2008): 525-52 | url=http://fhs.dukejournals.org/content/31/4/525.abstract
 
 "What Is the Gesta Francorum, and Who Is Peter Tudebode?" Revue Mabillon 16 (2005): 179-204.
 "Biography and Autobiography in the Middle Ages," in Writing Medieval History: Theory and Practice for the Post-Traditional Middle Ages, ed. Nancy Partner. Arnold: London, 2005, pp. 53–69.
 "Putting History to Use: Three Crusade Chronicles in Context," Viator: Medieval and Renaissance Studies 35 (2004): 131-68.

 

 "Liturgy Against History: The Competing Visions of Lanfranc and Eadmer of Canterbury." Speculum 74 (1999): 271-301.

References

External links
 "Apocalypse Then: The First Crusade - A conversation with Jay Rubenstein", Ideas Roadshow, 2013

1967 births
21st-century American historians
21st-century American male writers
University of California, Berkeley alumni
University of New Mexico faculty
University of Tennessee faculty
Alumni of the University of Oxford
American Rhodes Scholars
Living people
MacArthur Fellows
People from Cushing, Oklahoma
Carleton College alumni
American male non-fiction writers